Mamy Ndiaye  (born 26 November 1986 in Pikine) is a Senegalese women's international footballer who plays as a forward. She is a member of the Senegal women's national football team, and has played for IFK Kalmar in Sweden, Zaragoza CFF in Spain and Inter Arras FCF in France.

Early life
Mamy Ndiaye was born on 26 November 1986 in Pikine, Senegal. She is the daughter of former Senegalese football international Nguessiam Ndiaye, and her mother was an athlete. She credited her father for both her interest in association football as well as inheriting his ability at the sport.

Career

Club
When Ndiaye signed for Swedish side IFK Kalmar in 2008, she became the first female Senegalese football player to turn professional. She remained with the team until 2012, during which time she scored 110 times in all competitions. Ndiaye joined Kalmar while it was in the fourth division, and remained in the first team as it rose to the top division. She was the top goalscorer in the league during the 2012 season, when Kalmar finished in fifth place. She then transferred to Spanish side Zaragoza CFF for the following season before moving during 2015 to the French side Inter Arras FCF. Arras has refused to release Ndiaye for a match against Guinea in the 2016 Africa Women Cup of Nations qualification.

International
Ndiaye plays for the Senegal women's national football team, including at the 2010 African Women's Championship qualification and 2012 African Women's Championship. The 2012 AWC was the first time that the Senegal women's team qualified, with Ndiaye captaining the team at the tournament.

References

External links
 

1986 births
Living people
People from Dakar Region
Senegalese women's footballers
Women's association football forwards
IFK Kalmar players
Primera División (women) players
Senegal women's international footballers
Senegalese expatriate footballers
Senegalese expatriate sportspeople in Sweden
Expatriate women's footballers in Sweden
Senegalese expatriate sportspeople in Spain
Expatriate women's footballers in Spain